Prince Sommatiwongse Varodaya, The Prince of Nakhon Si Thammarat was the Prince of Siam (later Thailand He was a member of Siamese royal family is a son of King Chulalongkorn Rama V of Siam.

His mother was Queen Savang Vadhana, a daughter of King Mongkut (thus his father's half-sister) and Princess Piyamavadi

Prince Sommatiwongse Varodaya died on 17 June 1899 at the age 17.

Ancestry

References 

1822 births
1899 deaths
19th-century Thai people
19th-century Chakri dynasty
People from Bangkok
Thai male Chao Fa
Children of Chulalongkorn
Sons of kings